The Ministry of Health in Kenya is based in Nairobi at the Afya House. The current Cabinet Secretary for health is Ms. Susan Nakhumi
cha Wafula.

History 
The Ministry of Health traces its roots back to colonial times in British Kenya. Post independence, in the inaugural cabinet, the ministry was originally named the Ministry of Health and Housing. The inaugural holder of the post was Dr. Njoroge Mungai.

In 2008, the coalition government was formed and the Ministry of Health was divided into the Ministry of Public Health and the Ministry of Medical Services. However, this lasted for only four years, and the ministries merged into the unified Ministry of Health in 2013 after the formation of the Unity government.

The United States suspended their $21 million funding of the ministry over allegations of corruption on 9 May 2017.

Child agencies 
The Ministry of Health has 6 departments within the organization which focuses on their respective sector who are under the supervision of the Director of Medical Services, Principal secretary and Cabinet secretary. 
 Department of Preventive and Promotive Health
 Department of Curative and Rehabilitation Health Services
 Department of Standards and Quality Assurance and Regulations
 Department of Planning and Health Financing
 Department of Health Sector Coordination and Inter Government
 Department of Administrative Services

Historical list of ministers 
Bernard Mate (1961–1963)
Dr. Njoroge Mungai (1963)  
Joseph David Otiende (1965) 
Samuel Ole Tipis (1963-?)

Ministry of Health
Mwai Kibaki (1988–1991)
Charity Kaluki Ngilu (2003–2007)

Ministries of Public Health and Medical Services (created in 2008)
 Ministry of Public Health 
 Beth Mugo (2008-2012)
 Ministry of Medical Services 
 Peter Anyang Nyong'o (2008-2012)

Ministry of Health
 James Wainaina Macharia (2013-2015)
 Cleopa Kilonzo Mailu (2015-2017)
 Sicily Kariuki (2018-2020)
 Mutahi Kagwe (2020- 2022)
 Susan Nakhumicha Wafula (2022 - Present)

See also
 List of health departments and ministries

References

External links
 Healthcare in Kenya
 Ministry of Health
 Ministry of Health Strategy 2014-2018 

Government ministries of Kenya
Kenya